Highway One may refer to:

 Highway One (album), album by Bobby Hutcherson
 Highway One (film), 1977 Australian film
 "Highway One", a song by The Waifs from the album, Up All Night

See also
 List of highways numbered 1